Juan Larios López (born 12 January 2004) is a Spanish professional footballer who plays for Southampton as a left-back.

Club career

Early career 
Larios came through youth academies of Tomas, Sevilla and La Masia academy at FC Barcelona. He moved to England to join up with Manchester City in 2020, initially playing for their under-18 team. He made 32 appearances for City’s age group sides, as well as playing in the Papa John’s Trophy and had played every match for the City under-21 team from the beginning of the 2022–23 season up to the end of the August transfer window.

Southampton 
On 31 August 2022, Manchester City accepted offers from fellow Premier League club Southampton for Larios and his teammate Sam Edozie. They were the third and fourth players to move from the City youth team to Southampton in the summer of 2022, following in the footsteps of Gavin Bazunu and Romeo Lavia. Southampton had that summer hired Joe Shields to be their head of recruitment, having previously held the position of head of youth recruitment at Manchester City. It was reported that the fee for Larios that City received from Southampton was £6 million pounds and contains a 20% sell on clause, a buy-back clause, and an option to match any future offer received for Larios. Southampton manager Ralph Hasenhüttl praised Larios for his positional versatility, able to cover either flank, upon his announcement as a Southampton player. Two days after the move, Larios was an unused substitute for Southampton during a 1–0 loss at Wolverhampton Wanderers in the Premier League. He made his Premier League debut on 16 September 2022 for Southampton away at Aston Villa.

International career
Larios is a youth international for Spain, having played for the Spain U15s, Spain U18s, and Spain U19s.

Career statistics

Club

Notes

References

External links
 
 Profile at Southampton F.C. website
 
 

2004 births
Living people
Sportspeople from the Province of Seville
Spanish footballers
Spain youth international footballers
Association football fullbacks
Manchester City F.C. players
Southampton F.C. players
Premier League players